Horncastle is a town in Lincolnshire, England.

Horncastle may also refer to:

Places 
 Horncastle, Berkshire, a suburb of Reading, England
 Horncastle, Lincolnshire, England
 Horncastle railway station
 Horncastle (UK Parliament constituency)
 Horncastle, Ontario, Canada

People 
 James Horncastle, writer
 John Horncastle, a bishop
 Tristan Horncastle, songwriter
 William Horncastle, cricketer

Other 
 R v Horncastle [2009] UKSC 14, a decision of the UK Supreme Court

See also
 Louth and Horncastle (UK Parliament constituency)